The 2017 TheHouse.com 225 was the 16th stock car race of the 2017 NASCAR Camping World Truck Series, the final race of the 2017 NASCAR Camping World Truck Series regular season, and the ninth iteration of the event. The race was held on Friday, September 15, 2017, in Joliet, Illinois at Chicagoland Speedway, a  permanent D-shaped oval. The race took the scheduled 150 laps to complete. At race's end, Johnny Sauter, driving for GMS Racing, would control the last 28 laps of the race to win his 15th career NASCAR Camping World Truck Series win and his second of the season. To fill out the podium, Chase Briscoe of Brad Keselowski Racing and Christopher Bell of Kyle Busch Motorsports would finish second and third, respectively.

The eight drivers to qualify for the NASCAR playoffs were Christopher Bell, Johnny Sauter, John Hunter Nemechek, Matt Crafton, Chase Briscoe, Austin Cindric, Ben Rhodes, and Kaz Grala.

Background 

Chicagoland Speedway is a  tri-oval speedway in Joliet, Illinois, southwest of Chicago. The speedway opened in 2001 and currently hosts NASCAR races. Until 2011, the speedway also hosted the IndyCar Series, recording numerous close finishes, including the closest finish in IndyCar history. The speedway is owned and operated by International Speedway Corporation and is located adjacent to Route 66 Raceway.

Entry list 

 (R) denotes rookie driver.
 (i) denotes driver who is ineligible for series driver points.

Practice

First practice 
The first practice session was held on Thursday, September 14, at 2:30 PM CST. The session would last for 55 minutes.

Second and final practice 
The second and final practice session, sometimes referred to as Happy Hour, practice session was held on Thursday, September 14, at 4:30 PM CST. The session would last for 55 minutes.

Qualifying 
Qualifying was held on Friday, September 15, at 4:05 PM CST. Since Chicagoland Speedway is at least 1.5 miles (2.4 km) in length, the qualifying system was a single car, single lap, two round system where in the first round, everyone would set a time to determine positions 13–32. Then, the fastest 12 qualifiers would move on to the second round to determine positions 1–12.

No drivers would fail to qualify.

Full qualifying results

Race results 
Stage 1 Laps: 35

Stage 2 Laps: 35

Stage 3 Laps: 80

Standings after the race 

Drivers' Championship standings

Note: Only the first 8 positions are included for the driver standings.

References 

2017 NASCAR Camping World Truck Series
NASCAR races at Chicagoland Speedway
September 2017 sports events in the United States
2017 in sports in Illinois